Parris Brook Historic and Archeological District is a historic district in Exeter, Rhode Island.  The area includes remains of 18th- and 19th-century mill complexes, as well as prehistoric Native American rock shelters.  It is mostly located in the Arcadia Management Area, a natural preserve managed by the state, and on adjacent private land.

The district was added to the National Register of Historic Places in 1980.

See also
National Register of Historic Places listings in Washington County, Rhode Island

References

Exeter, Rhode Island
Historic districts in Washington County, Rhode Island
Historic districts on the National Register of Historic Places in Rhode Island